Mariya Shatalova or Mariia Shatalova (born 1 March 1989) is a Ukrainian middle-distance runner. She competed in the 3000 metres steeplechase event at the 2015 World Championships in Athletics in Beijing, China. In 2017, she competed in the women's 3000 metres steeplechase event at the 2017 World Championships in Athletics held in London, United Kingdom. She did not advance to compete in the final.

References

External links
 

1989 births
Living people
Ukrainian female middle-distance runners
Ukrainian female steeplechase runners
World Athletics Championships athletes for Ukraine
Place of birth missing (living people)
Athletes (track and field) at the 2016 Summer Olympics
Olympic athletes of Ukraine
Ukrainian Athletics Championships winners
20th-century Ukrainian women
21st-century Ukrainian women